The Journal of Generic Medicines is a quarterly peer-reviewed medical journal covering marketing, patent law, and regulatory issues relevant for generic drugs. The editor-in-chief is Brian Tempest (Hale & Tempest Co). It was established in 2001 and is published by SAGE Publications.

Abstracting and indexing 
The journal is abstracted and indexed in:
EBSCO databases
Embase/Excerpta Medica
ProQuest databases
Scopus (2003-2015, 2017; discontinued))

References

External links

SAGE Publishing academic journals
English-language journals
Business and management journals
Quarterly journals
Publications established in 2003